The Fox River is a  tributary of the Manistique River on the Upper Peninsula of Michigan in the United States.

In 1919, Ernest Hemingway spent time fishing the Fox after his return from Europe, where he had been hospitalized after injury in World War I.  That fishing expedition formed the basis of his early short-story "Big Two-Hearted River."

See also
List of rivers of Michigan

References

Michigan  Streamflow Data from the USGS

Rivers of Michigan
Tributaries of Lake Michigan